Weather-related fatalities in the United States may be caused by extreme temperatures, such as abnormal heat or cold, flooding, lightning, tornado, hurricane, wind, rip currents, and others. The National Weather Service compiles statistics on weather-related fatalities and publishes reports every year. In 2016, flooding was the number-one cause of weather-related fatalities, but over a 30-year period, on average, extreme heat is the deadliest form of weather.

Weather-related deaths

This table represents a 6-year period and only a select type of recorded weather events.  The data was tabulated by running searches on the specified weather events recorded with at least 1 fatality.  The yearly timeframes were selected to cover January 1 to December 31 of each year for each event type.

This table does not provide a comprehensive total of all weather-related events.  Also, this is not necessarily a weather event severity comparison, but is more of an indicator of frequency of fatal occurrences for some events.  However, the unexpected leader of fatalities comes from the temperature extremes category.  That category includes heat waves as well as cold extremes.

Heat-related deaths
Between 1979 and 2014, the death rate as a direct result of exposure to heat (underlying cause of death) generally hovered around 0.5 to 1 deaths per million people, with spikes in certain years. Overall, a total of more than 9,000 Americans have died from heat-related causes since 1979, according to death certificates.

Cold-related deaths
Cold weather is deadly too. For example, in the US, 21 people died in a cold wave in January 2014, which also caused property damage valued at US$2.5 billion

References

Inclement weather management
Deaths in the United States